Varicorbula gibba, the common basket-shell, is a species of bivalve in the family Corbulidae.

Taxonomy 
The species was originally described in 1792 by the Italian zoologist Giuseppe Olivi under the protonym of Tellina gibba. Some databases (e.g. SeaLifeBase) continue to classify it under the genus Corbula.

Description 

Distribution and habitat 
Varicorbula gibba is a marine species which occurs in Europe in the north-eastern Atlantic Ocean and the Mediterranean. It has been introduced to Australia.

References

External links 

 

Corbulidae
Bivalves of Europe